Glasson Dock railway station served the town of Glasson Dock, in 
Thurnham, Lancashire, England, with trains to nearby Conder Green and Lancaster along the Glasson Dock branch line.

History 
Glasson Dock was opened by the London & North Western Railway on 9 July 1883. The station passed to the London, Midland & Scottish Railway during the Grouping of 1923, only to be closed seven years later on 7 July 1930.

The site today 
The trackbed through the former station is now part of the Lancashire Coastal Way and the longer Bay Cycle Way. However, the station itself was demolished after goods services stopped in 1964.

References

Sources
 
 

Disused railway stations in Lancaster
Former London and North Western Railway stations
Railway stations in Great Britain opened in 1883
Railway stations in Great Britain closed in 1930